William D. Rubinstein (born 12 August 1946) is a historian and author. His best-known work, Men of Property: The Very Wealthy in Britain Since the Industrial Revolution, charts the rise of the 'super rich', a class he sees as expanding exponentially.

Early life

Rubinstein was born in New York City, and educated at Swarthmore College and Johns Hopkins University in the United States.

Career

Rubinstein worked at Lancaster University in England from 1974 to 1975, the Australian National University in Canberra during 1976–1978, Deakin University in Victoria, Australia from 1978 to 1995, and from 1995 to 2011 worked at Aberystwyth University, Wales.  At Deakin he had a personal chair in history, and at Aberystwyth he was professor of history. He was more recently an adjunct professor at Monash University in Melbourne.

He is an elected Fellow of the Australian Academy of the Humanities, the Academy of the Social Sciences in Australia, and of the Royal Historical Society.

He was President of the Jewish Historical Society of England from 2002 to 2004 and was the editor of the articles on Britain and the Commonwealth (except Canada) in the second (2006) edition of the reference work The Encyclopaedia Judaica. He was foundation editor (1988 to 1995) of the Journal of the Australian Jewish Historical Society (Victoria). He was one of the founders of the Australian Association for Jewish Studies (established 1987), and served as its President in 1989–91.

In Australia's Queen's Birthday Honours List 2022 he was awarded the Medal of the Order of Australia (OAM) for services to tertiary education and to Jewish history.

Career as author

Rubinstein is very widely published, essays and articles of his having appeared in various scholarly books and periodicals in Australia and overseas. Books of his have been translated into Finnish, Russian, French, Hebrew, Italian, Chinese, and Japanese. He is particularly known for his research on the wealth-holding classes in modern Britain, making use of probate and other taxation records, in such works as Men of Property: The Very Wealthy in Britain Since the Industrial Revolution (1981) and Capitalism, Culture and Decline in Britain, 1750–1990 (1991; Japanese translation, 1997). More recently he has co-authored (with Philip Beresford) The Richest of the Rich (2007), an account of the 250 richest-ever people in British history since the Norman Conquest. He authored The All-Time Australian 200 Rich List (2004).

A scholar of modern Jewish history, his books on that subject include A History of the Jews in the English-Speaking World: Great Britain (1996) and the controversial work, The Myth of Rescue (1997), which argues that the Allies could not have saved more Jews during the Holocaust. The famous historian Arthur M. Schlesinger Jr., in a quotation provided by the publisher on the book's dust jacket, described it as 'a commanding work of historical criticism', adding that 'Professor Rubinstein's rigorous analysis of a terrible time in human history should bring to an end the long and understandably emotional debate about the possibility of saving more victims of Hitler's Holocaust.' Also on the dust jacket is a quotation by William vanden Heuvel, the then-chairman of the board of the Roosevelt Institute in New York, describing the book as 'a most important contribution to the discussion of America's role and responsibility regarding the Holocaust'. Holocaust historian David Cesarani called The Myth of Rescue "a polemic that will quickly fade, while the monumental scholarship it seeks to denigrate will still be consulted by historians and students for years to come." Rubinstein in return called Cesarani's views of the subject "totally lacking in historical balance or context". Rubinstein has appeared in several historical documentaries on the Holocaust, including the BBC's Secrets of the Dead: Bombing Auschwitz, which premiered in the United States on the PBS network in January 2020.

Rubinstein also researches topics discussed by amateur historians but ignored by academics. His Shadow Pasts (2007) examines such topics as the assassination of President Kennedy, Jack the Ripper, and the Shakespeare authorship question. He also explored the topic of who wrote Shakespeare’s works in a book he co-authored with Brenda James, The Truth Will Out (2005), which hypothesizes that Sir Henry Neville (c. 1562-1615), an Elizabethan Member of Parliament and Ambassador to France, was the real author of Shakespeare’s works.

His wife Hilary L. Rubinstein is also a historian.

Bibliography
 The Biographical Dictionary of Life Peers
 The Myth Of Rescue
 Genocide: A History
 Britain's Century: A Social and Political History, 1815-1905 (The Arnold History of Britain)
 Men of Property: The Very Wealthy in Britain Since the Industrial Revolution
 Capitalism, Culture and Decline in Britain, 1750–1990
 A History of the Jews in the English Speaking World: Great Britain (Studies in Modern History)
 Jews in the Sixth Continent, Allen & Unwin, Sydney, 1987 (contributor and editor)
 The Jews in Australia: A Thematic History, Volume Two: 1945 to the Present, William Heinemann Australia (1991)
 Menders of the Mind: A History of the Royal Australian and New Zealand College of Psychiatrists 1946-1996 (co-author with Hilary L. Rubinstein)
 Philosemitism: Admiration and Support in the English-speaking World for Jews, 1840-1939 (co-author with Hilary L. Rubinstein)
 The Jews in the Modern World Since 1750 (co-author with Hilary L. Rubinstein, Dan Cohn-Sherbok, and Abraham J. Edelheit)
 Shadow Pasts
 The Richest of the Rich (co-author with Philip Beresford)
 Israel, the Jews and the West: The Fall and Rise of Antisemitism
 The Left, the Right and the Jews, Croom Helm, London (1982)
 The End of Ideology and the Rise of Religion: How Marxism and Other Secular Universalistic Ideologies Have Given Way to Religious Fundamentalism
 Who Were the Rich?: 1809 - 1839 v. 1: A Biographical Directory of British Wealth-holders (Several further volumes in this series are in print or preparation)
 The Truth Will Out (co-author with Brenda James)
 Who Wrote Shakespeare's Plays?
 The Palgrave Dictionary of Anglo-Jewish History, Palgrave Macmillan (2011),  (co-author with Michael A. Jolles, Hilary L. Rubinstein)
 Sir Henry Neville was Shakespeare: The Evidence, Amberley Publishing (2016),

References

1946 births
Living people
21st-century Australian historians
Fellows of the Academy of the Social Sciences in Australia
Fellows of the Australian Academy of the Humanities
Fellows of the Royal Historical Society
Recipients of the Medal of the Order of Australia
Johns Hopkins University alumni
Swarthmore College alumni
Academics of Lancaster University
Academics of Aberystwyth University
20th-century Australian historians
Academic staff of the Australian National University
Academic staff of Deakin University
21st-century British historians
20th-century British historians
21st-century American historians
21st-century American male writers
20th-century American historians
American male non-fiction writers
Historians from New York (state)
American emigrants to Australia
Australian historians of religion
American emigrants to the United Kingdom
Historians of the United Kingdom
British historians of religion
Historians of Jews and Judaism
Writers from New York City
Presidents of the Australian Association for Jewish Studies
20th-century American male writers